Robin Backhaus (born 15 June 1989) is a German freestyle swimmer who won a silver medal at the 2010 European Aquatics Championships in the 4×200 m freestyle relay.

References

External links
 
 Profile at deutsche-olympiamannschaft.de

1989 births
German male swimmers
German male freestyle swimmers
Living people
European Aquatics Championships medalists in swimming
21st-century German people